The Cleveland Open is an annual chess tournament held in Cleveland, Ohio. The tournament was not held from 2004 until 2008, when it was resurrected.

List of Winners

References 

Recurring sporting events established in 1992
1992 establishments in Ohio
Sports competitions in Cleveland